The European Holocaust Research Infrastructure (EHRI) is an international digital infrastructure and community. It is a joint undertaking of Holocaust historians, archivists, and specialists in digital humanities. Through the development of heritage archives into research infrastructures and by connecting the knowledge of heritage archives and making that knowledge relevant for research, EHRI aims to support Holocaust research, commemoration and education. EHRI is coordinated by the Netherlands-based NIOD Institute for War, Holocaust and Genocide Studies, and is directed by Reto Speck and Karel Berkhoff.

Objective 
EHRI’s objective is to support the Holocaust research community by building a digital infrastructure and facilitating human networks. The infrastructure deals with the wide dispersal of sources and expertise across many institutions by connecting sources, institutions and people. EHRI provides access to information about dispersed Holocaust-related sources through its Online Portal, as well as tools and methods that enable researchers and archivists to work collaboratively. Together with over twenty other organizations, EHRI digitalizes Holocaust research to preserve it for indefinite future reference. It aims to have as many institutions as possible join in via standardized digital connections.

      EHRI's Vision: Integration of Holocaust archives and research.
      EHRI's Mission: Securing trans-national Holocaust research, commemoration and education.

Projects

EHRI-1: 2010-2015 
The EHRI-1 project ran from October 2010 until March 2015. It received funding from the European Union under the Seventh Framework (FP7) Programme. Together with 19 partners from 13 countries and numerous associate partners, the EHRI-1 project aimed to support the European Holocaust research community. The project delivered the EHRI Portal, an online environment that can be used by both scholars and the general public to search Holocaust-related archival material. The portal hosts reports that provide per-country information about the Holocaust history and archival situation, research guides and other services.

EHRI-2: 2015-2019 
The EHRI-2 project ran from May 2015 to October 2019, and it was funded by the European Union under the Horizon 2020 Programme. Consisting of 24 partners from all over the globe, including institutions from European countries that are traditionally under-represented in the research field, the EHRI-2 project aimed to make previously inaccessible archival material accessible to both scholars and the general public. In 2018, the project was added to the European Strategy Forum for Research Infrastructures (ESFRI) Roadmap. The project concluded with the continual development of both the EHRI Portal (incorporating IRP2, the International Research Portal for Records Related to Nazi-Era Cultural Property) and the facilitation of the expanding Holocaust research community.

EHRI-PP: 2019-2022 
The EHRI Preparatory Phase (EHRI-PP) project was initiated to transform EHRI from a project into a permanent European research organization. The EHRI-PP project started in December 2019 and it is scheduled to finish in November 2022. Funded by the European Union under the Horizon 2020 Programme, this project focusses on the legal, financial and strategic work necessary to establish EHRI as a research infrastructure that will provide a continual service. Consisting of 15 partners from 13 countries, EHRI-PP aims to secure the long-term future of trans-national Holocaust research.

EHRI-3: 2020-2024 
The EHRI-3 project started in September 2020 and it is scheduled to finish in  August 2024. It is funded by the European Union under the Horizon 2020 Programme. Together with 26 partners from all over the globe, the third phase of EHRI aims to deepen the integration of Holocaust archives by developing tools and protocols that grant access to archives that are currently inaccessible, in addition to further enhancing trans-national access via the portal. The project will also focus on the integration of new communities and discussions about antisemitism, xenophobia, non-discrimination, and religious and cultural tolerance.

Services offered 
EHRI offers a wide range of services to both the research community and the wider public, for example:

 The EHRI Portal, an online portal that aims to offer a single point of access to information on Holocaust-related archival material held in institutions across Europe and beyond.
 The EHRI Conny Kristel Fellowship, a fellowship program intended to support and stimulate Holocaust research by facilitating international access to key archives and collections.
 The EHRI Document Blog, a space to share ideas about Holocaust-related archival documents.
 The Online edition of Early Holocaust Testimony, a collection of samples of early testimonies of Jewish witnesses and survivors taken before the 1960s.
 An Interactive Online Course in Holocaust Studies, designed by EHRI partner Yad Vashem. This course offers a comprehensive insight into various primary sources essential for Holocaust research.
 The EHRI Online Course in Holocaust Studies, a resource aimed to provide teachers, lecturers and students with source material and background information in order to give them an overview of recent trends in historiography.
 Various seminars, conferences and workshops

Partners 
EHRI has 26 partners, representing archives, libraries, museums and research institutions.

Type of organization 
Though initially project based, the European Holocaust Research Infrastructure is on the road towards becoming a European Research Infrastructure Consortium (ERIC), a destination it plans to reach in 2025.

Published literature on EHRI can be found on the EHRI bibliography page.

References

Further reading

External links
Official website

2010 establishments in Europe
Online archives
European Commission projects
Mass digitization
Holocaust historical documents
Digital library projects